The Château de Rueil (formerly spelled Ruel, also referred to as the Château du Val de Ruel) was a 17th-century French château located in Rueil-Malmaison. It was especially famous for its gardens, created before those of Vaux-le-Vicomte and Versailles, and was the preferred residence of Cardinal Richelieu from at least 1633 (when he purchased it) until his death in 1642.

History
The origins of the château are obscure, but it was probably initially constructed in the 1560s and purchased in 1606 by a courtier of Henri IV of France, Jean de Moisset, who  added to the château and acquired additional land for the expansion of the gardens. The property was bought in 1633 by Cardinal Richelieu, who had the architect Jacques Lemercier remodel and enlarge the château, as well as the gardens and grounds. The château and grounds were renovated again in 1750 by Philippe Dullin de La Ponneraye. During the reign of Louis-Philippe, the buildings were demolished, and the  estate was subdivided. Remnants include three basins (one four-lobed), a house (now known as the Maison du Père Joseph), and a stone bench, all formerly part of the gardens.

Gardens

Notes

Bibliography
 Ballon, Hilary; Helot-Lécroart, Dominique (1985)."Le Château et les jardins de Rueil du temps de Jean de Moisset et du Cardinal de Richelieu," Paris et Ile-de-France, Mémoires, vol. 36, pp. 19–94. . Article pdf available for purchase at the website of the Cths.
 Ballon, Hilary (2002). "The Architecture of Cardinal Richelieu", pp. 246–259, in Richelieu: Art and Power, exhibition catalog, edited by Hilliard Todd Goldfarb. Ghent: Snoeck. .
 Gady, Alexandre (2005). Jacques Lemercier : Architecte et ingénieur du Roi. Paris: Éditions de la Maison des sciences de l'homme. .
 Kay, Thornton (4 February 2014). "Cardinal Richelieu's stone garden bench on SalvoWEB", retrieved 10 March 2016.

External links

 "L'Ermitage ou la Maison du Père Joseph", Société historique de Rueil-Malmaison
 Photographs of the remnants of the gardens at the Topic Topos website :
 Maison du Père Joseph
 Water basin
 Vestiges of a nymph
 Sculpted stone bench

Rueil
Ancien Régime French architecture